Adieu False Heart is a collaborative album by American singer, songwriter, and producer Linda Ronstadt featuring Cajun music singer Ann Savoy. It peaked at #146 on the Billboard album chart and nominated at the 2006 Grammy Awards for Best Traditional Folk Album and Best Engineered Album, Non-Classical. This was Ronstadt's last studio album before her retirement in 2011 and the revelation of her affliction with Parkinson's disease in 2013 (later revealed to actually be progressive Supranuclear palsy in 2019), which has left her unable to perform or sing.

Production 
Ronstadt, a soprano, and Savoy, an alto, had previously recorded duets for the Savoy-produced album Evangeline Made: A Tribute to Cajun Music; here, they sing together as The Zozo Sisters on the album, which brings together a mixture of Louisiana Cajun sounds, popular music of the 20th century, and folk/rock classics. The album includes an interpretation of The Left Banke's 1966 hit "Walk Away Renée", Harry Belafonte's 1950s hit by John Jacob Niles "Go Away From My Window" and the French classic "Parlez-Moi D'Amour". Ronstadt takes lead on Julie Miller's "I Can't Get Over You," with Julie's husband Buddy Miller on guitar and Savoy takes lead on Richard Thompson's "Burns' Supper."

On her collaboration with Savoy, Ronstadt remarked: "We could have made a quilt, I guess, except we're musicians, so we're making a record together instead. She sings in French — I don't speak French — but there's traditional love in this bond."

The album was recorded at Dirk Powell’s Cypress House Studio in Louisiana. It features local musicians, including Chas Justus, Eric Frey and Kevin Wimmer of the Red Stick Ramblers, Sam Broussard of The Mamou Playboys, Dirk Powell and Joel Savoy, as well as Nashville performers, like fiddler Stuart Duncan, mandolinist Sam Bush and guitarist Bryan Sutton.

Critical response and accolades 
The Ronstadt/Savoy album received good reviews and landed on several year-end Top Ten lists. It peaked at #146 on the Billboard album chart. The recording earned two Grammy Award nominations, including Best Traditional Folk Album and Best Engineered Album, Non-Classical.

Track listing 
 "Opening" – 0:32
 "Adieu False Heart" (Arthur Smith) – 3:34
 "I Can't Get Over You" (Julie Miller) – 3:07
 "Marie Mouri" (David Greely) – 3:31
 "King of Bohemia" (Richard Thompson) – 3:04
 "Plus Tu Tournes" (Michel Hindenoch) – 2:45
 "Go Away From My Window" (John Jacob Niles) – 3:01
 "Burns' Supper" (Thompson) – 3:43
 "The One I Love Is Gone" (Bill Monroe) – 2:37
 "Interlude" – 0:24
 "Rattle My Cage" (Chas Justus) – 2:48
 "Parlez-Moi D'Amour" (Jean Lenoir) – 4:06
 "Too Old To Die Young" (Scott Dooley, John Hadley, Kevin Welch) – 3:17
 "Interlude" – 0:31
 "Walk Away Renée" (Michael Brown, Bob Calilli, Tony Sansone) – 3:26
 "Closing" – 1:08

Personnel 
 Linda Ronstadt – lead vocals on 3, 5, 7, 11, 13 (3rd verse), 15; harmony vocals on 2, 4, 5, 6, 8, 10, 12, 13
 Ann Savoy – lead vocals on 2, 4, 6, 8, 9, 12, 13, 15 (on choruses and 3rd verse); harmony vocals on 3, 7, 11; acoustic guitar on 6, 12
 Dirk Powell – fretless banjo on 2, 11, 16; upright bass on 5; accordion on 8, 9
 Sam Broussard – acoustic guitar on 2, 5, 7, 8, 15
 Andrea Zonn – resophonic viola on 1, 16; viola on 3; violin on 5, 7, 12, 15
 Stuart Duncan – fiddle on 2, 11, 13
 David Schnaufer – bowed dulcimer on 2, 10, 13; dulcimer on 11, 13, 14
 Bryon House – upright bass on 2, 3, 7, 8, 11, 13, 15
 Buddy Miller – acoustic guitar on 3
 Tim Lauer – accordion on 3
 Kevin Wimmer – fiddle on 4, 6, 9
 Joel Savoy – acoustic guitar on 4, 9; lead guitar on 6; fiddle on 9
 Chas Justus – acoustic guitar on 4, 6, 9, 12
 Eric Frey – upright bass on 4, 6, 9, 12
 Kristin Wilkinson – viola and string arrangements on 5, 7, 8, 15
 John Catchings – cello on 5, 7, 8, 15
 Christine Balfa – triangle on 6
 Sam Bush – mandolin on 7, 8, 11
 Bryan Sutton - acoustic guitar on 13
 Gary Paczosa – Engineer, Mixing

References 

2006 albums
Collaborative albums
Linda Ronstadt albums
Ann Savoy albums
Albums produced by Steve Buckingham (record producer)
Vanguard Records albums